Ralph McCubbin Howell is a Wellington-based New Zealand playwright and actor. He was the recipient of the 2014 Bruce Mason Playwriting Award. His work The Devil's Half Acre was commissioned and produced by the 2016 New Zealand International Festival of the Arts.

Howell often performs as an actor in his own work, with roles in many initial productions of his plays including The Bookbinder, The Devil's Half Acre, The Road That Wasn't There, Broken River, and The Engine room.

Awards
 2014 – Bruce Mason New Zealand Playwright of the Year award.
 2014 – The BookBinder: Best Theatre; Best in the Fringe; Tiki Tour Ready Award – New Zealand Fringe Festival
 2013 – The Road That Wasn't There:  Outstanding New NZ Play; Most Promising New Director
 2013 – Production of the Year – Chapman Tripp Theatre Awards Auckland Arts Festival Award – Auckland Fringe Festival 2013
 2011 – Outstanding new New Zealand Playwright of the Year – Chapman Tripp Theatre Awards 2011

References

Living people
21st-century New Zealand dramatists and playwrights
Year of birth missing (living people)
21st-century New Zealand male writers
New Zealand male dramatists and playwrights